Al-Muhdar Mosque or Al-Mihdar Mosque is one of the historical mosques in the ancient city of Tarim, in the Yemeni province of Hadramaut. It is attributed to Omar Al-Mihdar bin Abdul-Rahman Al-Saqqaf, a Muslim leader who lived in the city during the 15th-century.

Architecture 
The building is characterized by Islamic geometric design. Its layout consists of an open courtyard surrounded by four corridors, the biggest of which contains the qiblah, which is adorned with three exquisite frescoes decorated with geometric, floral and scriptural motifs. It is square-shaped and there is a staircase reaching to the top inside. It was built around 1914 CE (1333 AH), and is built of adobe. This minaret was designed by the architect 'Awad Salman 'Afif al-Tarimi, who had already carried out many designs and constructions of clay lattices and domes, and the maintenance and supervision were conducted by Abu Bakr bin Shihab (d. 1345 AH). It is considered one of the most important architectural sites and destinations for visitors and researchers of the city of Tarim.

Al-Ahqaf Library 
Al-Ahqaf Library occupies the ground floor of the mosque building, which was built to accommodate the need to store the large number of manuscripts in the city of Tarim and neighboring cities. Tarim has been considered a distinguished Islamic scientific center since the 10th-century in Wadi Hadramaut region.

See also
 List of mosques in Yemen

References

External links
 Archnet.org: Masjid al-Mihdhar
 MCID: Al-Muhdhar Mosque

Buildings and structures completed in 1914
Mosques completed in 1914
Mosques in Yemen